The Taiwan Halal Center (THC) is an organization that promotes the Halal industry in Taiwan.

History
The organization was established by Taiwan External Trade Development Council on 21 April 2017 in Taipei. It is part of the New Southbound Policy.

Awards
The organization won a Malaysia Tourism Council gold award on 31 October 2018.

See also
 Islam in Taiwan
 Taiwan Halal Integrity Development Association

References

External links
 

2017 establishments in Taiwan
Halal food
Islamic organizations based in Taiwan
Organizations based in Taipei
Religious organizations established in 2017
Islamic organizations established in the 21st century